Vallesia is a genus of plants in the family Apocynaceae first described as a genus in 1794. It is native to South America, Central America, Mexico, Florida, Galápagos, and the West Indies.

Species
 Vallesia antillana Woodson - Cuba, Jamaica, Dominican Republic, Florida, Bahamas, Yucatán Peninsula
 Vallesia aurantiaca (M.Martens & Galeotti) J.F.Morales - C + S Mexico, Central America
 Vallesia baileyana Woodson - Sonora
 Vallesia conzattii Standl. - Oaxaca
 Vallesia glabra (Cav.) Link - Mexico; South America from Colombia to Paraguay
 Vallesia hypoglauca Ernst - Venezuela
 Vallesia laciniata Brandegee - Baja California
 Vallesia montana Urb. - Cuba, Hispaniola
 Vallesia pubescens Andersson - Galápagos
 Vallesia sinaloensis El.Mey. ex J.F.Morales - Sinaloa
 Vallesia spectabilis El.Mey. ex J.F.Morales - Jalisco
Vallesia vaupesana J.F.Morales - Vaupes in Colombia

formerly included
Vallesia macrocarpa Hillebr. = Pteralyxia laurifolia (G.Lodd.) Leeuwenb.

References

Apocynaceae genera
Rauvolfioideae
Taxa named by José Antonio Pavón Jiménez